The EuroLeague Regular Season and Top 16 MVP were awards that were given out by the top-tier level European-wide men's professional club basketball league, the EuroLeague. The EuroLeague initially gave out MVP awards for both the "regular season" and top 16 stages of the competition (the first two group stages of the season). Since these stages of the season each only encompassed a portion of the actual EuroLeague full season, these awards were eventually phased out. 

The EuroLeague then created the EuroLeague MVP of the Month award, which was a more fitting and appropriate award to give out instead for individual stages of the season; along with the EuroLeague Full Season MVP award, which is decided by a voting process, and covers the entire EuroLeague season, until the EuroLeague Final Four, which also has its own MVP award.

Selection criteria
The EuroLeague, under its original league format, consisted of four phases. The first phase was the "regular season", which was the first group stage. The second phase was the top 16 stage, which was the second group stage. The third phase was the playoffs stage, and the fourth phase was the EuroLeague Final Four stage. The Regular Season MVP was the MVP award for the first phase of the season, and the Top 16 MVP was the MVP award for the second phase of the season.

The Performance Index Rating (PIR) statistical formula was largely determinant in the selection process of these awards. The player with the highest PIR statistical score of the first group stage of the season was named the MVP of the regular season phase, while the PIR statistical score was also strongly emphasized in the selection of the MVP of the top 16 phase.

EuroLeague Regular Season MVP award winners (2001–04)

This was an award for the first group stage of the season, which encompassed between 10-14 games in total. The award was first given in the 2000–01 season, and was awarded every season through the 2003–04 season. The first group stage was 10 games in the 2000–01 season, and it was 14 games in the 2001–02, 2002–03, and 2003–04 seasons. The player with the highest PIR statistical score was named the Regular Season MVP.

EuroLeague Top 16 MVP award winners (2002–04)

This was an award for the second group stage of the season, which encompassed 6 games in total. The award was given out during the 2001–02, 2002–03, and 2003–04 seasons. The PIR statistical score and team record were emphasized in the selection of the Top 16 MVP.

See also
EuroLeague Full Season MVP
EuroLeague Final Four MVP
Performance Index Rating (PIR)

References

External links
 EuroLeague Official Web Page
 InterBasket EuroLeague Basketball Forum
 TalkBasket EuroLeague Basketball Forum
 

Regular season MVP